The following is a list of rulers of the Kingdom of Garo or Bosha. Bosha was one of the kingdoms on the periphery of the Gibe region of Ethiopia. It existed from 1567 to 1883.

List of Rulers of Bosha or Garo

Source: Werner J. Lange, History of the Southern Gonga (Southwestern Ethiopia) (Wiesbaden: Franz Steiner, 1982), p. 64.

See also
Monarchies of Ethiopia
Rulers of Ethiopia
Rulers and heads of state of Ethiopia

Ethiopia history-related lists
Lists of African rulers
 Bosha